On July 27, 2022, clashes between Druze militiamen and pro-Assad forces took place in the southeastern Syrian city of As-Suwayda. The clashes left 17 people dead, and over 40 people wounded.

Background 
As-Suwayda is a city in southeastern Syria, predominantly inhabited by the Druze people. Throughout the Syrian Civil War, it has been controlled mainly by government forces, and its position deep in government-controlled territory has seen the city with relative peace. In 2020, civilians in the city protested against President Bashar al-Assad for the first time since 2015, due to a deteriorating economic situation. While Assad did make some concessions, by sacking Prime Minister Imad Khamis and replacing him with Hussein Arnous, the underlying economic problems in the city did not change. Renewed protests occurred in February 2022, as a result of the bad economic and living situations and a rise of lawlessness and increased killings throughout the governorate. Because of this, local militias have formed in the city and governorate to defend against killings and ISIS attacks.

On July 23, 2022, members of the pro-government militia Al-Falhout, which operates in the As-Suwayda area, kidnapped a Druze militiaman named Jad Hussein al-Tawil, sparking protests in al-Tawil's hometown of Shahba in As-Suwayda governorate. The protests died down, although restarted two days later on July 25 after Al-Falhout kidnapped 4 government officials in Shahba.

Battle 
The clashes began on July 27 following the kidnappings of the previous days, and "flared up very suddenly" according to Suwayda 24 journalist Rayan Maarouf. Local militiamen in As-Suwayda surrounded the headquarters of the Al-Falhout militia, and later stormed it. Captagon pills were found in the headquarters. The clashes left 10 Falhout soldiers and 7 local militiamen dead, according to the Syrian Observatory of Human Rights. 40 people were injured in the conflict, including an unknown number of civilians.

See also 
 Timeline of the Syrian civil war (2022)

References 

Battles of the Syrian civil war
History of Syria
As-Suwayda Governorate
As-Suwayda District
As-Suwayda Governorate in the Syrian civil war
As-Suwayda_clashes
As-Suwayda_clashes